Schoenobius scirpus is a moth in the family Crambidae. It was described by Fu-Qiang Chen and Chun-Sheng Wu in 2014. It is found in Guangxi, China.

The larvae feed on Scirpus grossus.

Etymology
The species name refers to the genus name of the host plant.

References

Moths described in 2014
Schoenobiinae